The Longwood Lancers women's basketball team is the Division I basketball team that represents Longwood University in Farmville, Virginia. The school's team currently competes in the Big South Conference of the National Collegiate Athletic Association.

History
Longwood began play in 1920, with official NCAA status beginning in 1976. They were in Division II from 1980 to 2004 (playing in the Carolinas-Virginia Athletic Conference (CVAC) from 1995 to 2003), before transitioning to Division I from 2004 to 2007. They made the Division II Tournament in 1995, 1996, 1997, and 2003.

In March 2022, the Lancers won the Big South tournament championship and earned the school’s first-ever bid to the NCAA Division I Tournament. The team also tied for first place and won the regular-season Big South divisional title.

Conference affiliations 
 1972–73 to 1981–82: Association for Intercollegiate Athletics for Women
 1982–83: NCAA Division II Independent
 1983–84 to 1987–88: Mason–Dixon Conference
 1988–89 to 1994–95: NCAA Division II Independent
 1995–96 to 2002–03: Carolinas–Virginia Athletic Conference
 2003–04: NCAA Division II Independent
 2004–05 to 2011–12: NCAA Division I Independent
 2012–13 to present: Big South Conference

Postseason

NCAA Division I tournament results
The Lancers have appeared in one NCAA tournament. Their combined record is 1–1.

NCAA Division II tournament results
The Lancers made four appearances in the NCAA Division II women's basketball tournament. They had a combined record of 2–4.

References

External links